The Grotto is the sixth solo album released by Kristin Hersh. It was released on 17 March 2003 on 4AD records, simultaneously with the Throwing Muses (2003) record. It features Howe Gelb on piano and Andrew Bird on violin. Kristin Hersh produced the album as well as playing all other instruments. The album peaked at #39 on the US's Billboard Top Independent Albums Chart.

Critical reception

The Grotto was met with "generally favorable" reviews from critics. At Metacritic, which assigns a weighted average rating out of 100 to reviews from mainstream publications, this release received an average score of 75, based on 14 reviews. Aggregator Album of the Year gave the release a 74 out of 100 based on a critical consensus of 5 reviews.

Track listing

References

External links
 The Grotto at 4AD
 The Grotto at the official online store
 Three free songs at the artists site

2003 albums
Kristin Hersh albums
Sire Records albums
4AD albums